Michael Rabasca is an American soccer coach who currently serves as director of high performance for Toronto FC in Major League Soccer. He previously served as head coach of Toronto FC II in USL League One.

Career

In 1996, Rabasca was working as a coach at Marcos de Niza High School. In 2014, he worked with the Toronto FC staff, and in 2020 returned to the first team as the director of high performance.

References

1969 births
Living people
American soccer coaches
Toronto FC II coaches
USL League One coaches